Maria Gąsienica Daniel-Szatkowska (5 February 1936 – 1 January 2016) was a Polish alpine skier. She competed at the 1956 Winter Olympics and the 1964 Winter Olympics. She was the sister of fellow Olympians Helena Gąsienica Daniel, Andrzej Gąsienica Daniel and Józef Gąsienica Daniel, as well as fellow competitive skier Franciszek Gąsienica Daniel.

References

1936 births
2016 deaths
Polish female alpine skiers
Olympic alpine skiers of Poland
Alpine skiers at the 1956 Winter Olympics
Alpine skiers at the 1964 Winter Olympics
Sportspeople from Zakopane
20th-century Polish women